The 2006 Delray Beach International Tennis Championships was an ATP men's tennis tournament held in Delray Beach, Florida in the United States. The tournament was held from January 30 to February 6.

Finals

Singles

 Tommy Haas defeated  Xavier Malisse 6–3, 3–6, 7–6(7–5)
 It was Haas' 1st title of the year and the 8th of his career.

Doubles

 Mark Knowles /  Daniel Nestor defeated  Chris Haggard /  Wesley Moodie 6–2, 6–3
 It was Knowles' 1st title of the year and the 40th of his career. It was Nestor's 1st title of the year and the 42nd of his career.

References

External links
 ATP tournament profile
 ITF tournament edition details

 
Delray Beach International Tennis Championships
Delray Beach International Tennis Championships
Delray Beach International Tennis Championships
Delray Beach International Tennis Championships
Delray Beach International Tennis Championships
Delray Beach Open